That Other Woman is a 1942 American comedy film directed by Ray McCarey, written by Jack Jungmeyer, and starring Virginia Gilmore, James Ellison, Dan Duryea, Janis Carter, Alma Kruger and Lon McCallister. It was released on November 13, 1942, by 20th Century Fox.

Plot

Cast   
Virginia Gilmore as Emily Borden
James Ellison as Henry Summers
Dan Duryea as Ralph Cobb
Janis Carter as Constance Powell
Alma Kruger as Grandma Borden
Lon McCallister as George Borden 
Minerva Urecal as Mrs. MacReady
Charles Arnt as Bailey
Charles Halton as Smith
Charles Trowbridge as Linkletter
Frank Pershing as Lauderback
George Melford as Zineschwich
Paul Fix as Tough Guy
Syd Saylor as Tramp
Henry Roquemore as Clerk
Leon Belasco as Walter

References

External links 
 

1942 films
20th Century Fox films
American comedy films
1942 comedy films
Films directed by Ray McCarey
American black-and-white films
Films scored by Arthur Lange
1940s English-language films
1940s American films